Bryan Clements (born 10 September 1942) is  a former Australian rules footballer who played with Fitzroy in the Victorian Football League (VFL).

Football
On 6 July 1963, playing in the first ruck, he was a member of the young and inexperienced Fitzroy team that comprehensively and unexpectedly defeated Geelong, 9.13 (67) to 3.13 (31) in the 1963 Miracle Match.

See also
 1963 Miracle Match

Notes

References
 
 Spaull, Roger (2014), "Bryan Clements -- Fitzroy FC -- A Day To Remember At The Brunswick Street Oval", Boyles Football Photos, 18 May 2014.

External links 
 		
 

Living people
1942 births
Australian rules footballers from Victoria (Australia)
Fitzroy Football Club players